Aleksandr Aleksandrovich Grekhov (born 10 October 1977) is a former Russian football player.

External links
 

1977 births
Living people
Russian footballers
FC Torpedo Moscow players
FC Torpedo-2 players
Russian Premier League players
FC Tyumen players
Piteå IF (men) players
Russian expatriate footballers
Expatriate footballers in Sweden
FC Ural Yekaterinburg players
Place of birth missing (living people)
Association football midfielders
FC Orenburg players
FC Nosta Novotroitsk players